Mirron Alexandroff (1923 - April 20, 2001) was a 20th-century educator and the sixth president of Columbia College Chicago. Succeeding his father, Norman Alexandroff, as the president of the college in 1961, Mirron Alexandroff is highly credited for reinventing the school as a liberal-arts college with a "hands-on minds-on" approach to arts and media education with a progressive social agenda.

References

1923 births
2001 deaths
Columbia College Chicago people
People from Chicago
20th-century American academics